Yatheem is a 1977 Indian Malayalam-language film,  scripted by Moidu Padiyath directed by M. Krishnan Nair and produced by T. E. Vasudevan. The film stars Sheela, K. P. Ummer, Sudheer, Vidhubala, Adoor Bhasi, Thikkurissy Sukumaran Nair and Kottayam Santha. The film has musical score by M. S. Baburaj.

Cast

Sheela
K. P. Ummer
Sudheer
Vidhubala as Zainaba
Ravikumar as Siddhique
Sathaar as Azees
Unnimary 
Bahadoor  
Adoor Bhasi 
Thikkurissy Sukumaran Nair 
Kottayam Santha 
Prameela
Sankaradi 
Sreemoolanagaram Vijayan
Nilambur Balan 
Khadeeja 
Kunjava
Nellikode Bhaskaran as Sakkath Mammad
Pala Thankam 
Paravoor Bharathan as Hameed
Philomina  
Santha Devi  
Vanchiyoor Radha

Soundtrack
The music was composed by MS Baburaj and the lyrics were written by P. Bhaskaran.

References

External links
 

1977 films
1970s Malayalam-language films
Films scored by M. S. Baburaj
Films directed by M. Krishnan Nair